Charndon is a hamlet and civil parish in the Aylesbury Vale district of Buckinghamshire, England.

The hamlet's toponym combines Brythonic and Old English origins, as is common with other places in this part of the country (see, for example, Brill and Bow Brickhill). It means "cairn hill", cairn being a Celtic word for a ceremonial hill or pile of stones. The Domesday Book of 1086 records the hamlet as Credendone.

During World War Two a Vickers Wellington Bomber Aircraft crashed West of the Hamlet, killing all on board.

Within the hamlet of Charndon is the Charndon Grounds estate, once the site of a large country house.

References

Further reading

Hamlets in Buckinghamshire
Civil parishes in Buckinghamshire